Petar Stošković (born 25 July 1993) is a Dutch football player of Serbian descent. He plays for SteDoCo.

Club career
He made his Eerste Divisie debut for Dordrecht on 13 January 2019 in a game against his former club Den Bosch and allowed 6 goals in the game.

References

External links
 

1993 births
Footballers from Dordrecht
Dutch people of Serbian descent
Living people
Dutch footballers
Association football goalkeepers
FC Den Bosch players
VV UNA players
FC Dordrecht players
OFC Oostzaan players
SteDoCo players
Eerste Divisie players
Tweede Divisie players
Derde Divisie players